

Up to 1799 
Before 1770 (William de Grey), between 1775 and 1780 (Edward Meux Worsley to Sir William Lynch), and between 1782 and 1787 (John Buller to Sir George Duckett) the date given is that of the writ to replace the member who accepted the Stewardship.

1800 to 1849

References
Specific

Chiltern Hundreds